Erling Welle-Strand (25 October 1916 – 24 May 2013) was a Norwegian writer and resistance member.

Early life
He was born in Bergen as a son of novelist and journalist Edvard Welle-Strand (1884–1964) and teacher Elsa Kielland, née Lindhé (1888–1979). Erling's father was a sub-editor in a local newspaper, Bergens Aftenblad, and was also known to some as an anti-Semitic writer. Himself, Erling Welle-Strand belonged to the "radical wing of the Labour Party" before World War II. He grew up in Bergen and finished his secondary education at Bergen Cathedral School in 1935. He worked briefly as a press secretary for the theatre Den Nationale Scene before studying at the University of Oslo.

World War II
In 1940 Norway was invaded by Nazi Germany, and his studies were interrupted; instead he fought in Valdres in the Norwegian Campaign. He participated in a Norwegian victory at Bagn, but Norway lost in the end and was occupied. Welle-Strand fled the country for Shetland in 1941, together with Reidar Kvinge and Per Hysing-Dahl. He worked as a journalist for the Norwegian government-in-exile for eight months before attending military college. He graduated from military college in 1943, then spent some time in an Officer Cadet Training Unit before serving on a Norwegian Motor Torpedo Boat (MTB). He was then enrolled into the Norwegian Independent Company 1, and on 31 December 1944 he was parachuted over Hadelandsåsen to work as an agent in his home country. He established an anti-sabotage training school at nearby Svartåsseter. His main task was to secure important facilities, hereunder electricity and telecommunications, in case the Germans lost the war and would withdraw using a scorched earth tactic. The operation was called the "Foscot plan", and Welle-Strand cooperated with Milorg's District 13. His nom de guerre was "David".

He was decorated with the Defence Medal 1940–1945, the War Medal and the Haakon VII 70th Anniversary Medal. His brother Erik Welle-Strand was a resistance member too.

Post-war life
After the war he resumed his studies, and graduated with a cand.philol. degree in history in 1945. He took up a career in the travel industry, in the organization Norway Travel Association. He headed their office in Stockholm from 1946 to 1950 and the office in Oslo from 1950 to 1955. From 1955 he worked as a freelance writer, but still in the field of tourism and travelling. He issued books about travelling with Hurtigruten in 1953 and 1966, and several books about domestic tourism. The book Reiseliv og samfunn was written for the 75th anniversary of the Norway Travel Association in 1978. Between 1964 and 1979 he edited six editions of the road map issued by the Norwegian Automobile Federation, NAFs veibok. In his later career he began writing books about the Second World War. Three collections of war stories came in 1989, 1990 and 1991. In 2000 he released Vi vil verne vårt land. Antisabotasje i Norge 1944–1945.

Welle-Strand was married twice, first to a daughter of aide-de-camp and sports leader Nikolai Ramm Østgaard, then to language teacher. His daughter Ragni (b. 1946) was married to famous writer Edvard Hoem from 1982 to 1995.

References

1916 births
2013 deaths
Military personnel from Bergen
People educated at the Bergen Cathedral School
Norwegian expatriates in the United Kingdom
Norwegian Army personnel of World War II
Royal Norwegian Navy personnel of World War II
Norwegian Special Operations Executive personnel
University of Oslo alumni
Norwegian non-fiction writers
Norwegian World War II memoirists
Writers from Bergen